Hariyawan is a village and corresponding community development block in Hardoi district of Uttar Pradesh, India. It hosts a market on Wednesdays and Sundays. The main staple foods here are wheat and rice. As of 2011, its population is 2,997, in 508 households.

Demographic history 
The 1961 census recorded Hariyawan as comprising three hamlets, with a total population of 1,573 (832 male and 746 female), in 247 households and 221 physical houses. The area of the village was given as 766 acres.

The 1981 census recorded Hariyawan as having a population of 2,099, in 384 households, and covering an area of 310.00 hectares.

Villages 
Hariyawan CD block has the following 92 villages:

References 

Villages in Hardoi district